Eyes Open is the fourth studio album by Northern Irish-Scottish alternative rock band Snow Patrol. Produced by Jacknife Lee, it was released in the UK on 1 May 2006, and 9 May 2006 in the US. It was the band's first album without bassist Mark McClelland and the first to feature bassist Paul Wilson and keyboardist Tom Simpson. Recording for the album took place between October and December 2005 at Grouse Lodge Studios in Ireland, The Garage in Kent, and The Garden and Angel Recording Studios, both in London.

Six singles were released from the album, including top 10 hits "You're All I Have" and "Chasing Cars", the latter of which came to worldwide attention when it was featured during the season 2 finale of the American medical drama Grey's Anatomy.

Eyes Open was the best-selling album of 2006 in the UK, selling 1.5 million copies. It was also the 15th best-selling album of the 2000s, and is one of the best-selling albums in UK chart history.

Recording and composition

Snow Patrol's primary aim for a fourth album was to create a better one than the previous, Final Straw. They felt the need to become better players of their respective instruments as they thought they had "barely [gotten] away" with the success of the last album. Subsequently, keyboardist Tom Simpson and drummer Jonny Quinn took classical piano and drum lessons respectively, during the recording of the album.

The band visited Dingle, on Ireland's west coast and started writing new material. They stayed in a small house, described by Simpson as a "little round house overlooking the sea". They then did some recording in a studio. The main recording sessions, though, happened in an old "condemned" studio in Westmeath, located in the central part of the country. Simpson found the place to be "laid-back" and "almost like a holiday home". The location was in a secluded area, quite distant from any civilization, with animals running around. This helped the band concentrate well without much distraction. The band stayed there for six weeks. Simpson felt the reason why producer Jacknife Lee was taking the band to different places was because he did not want them to get too comfortable with the surroundings. The songs were generally not written as a whole, but the band wrote them as they "came". The writing process thus varied for each song; instead of spending excess time on one and overworking themselves, the band chose to work on another, often revisiting the song later. The band was also constantly changing song arrangements. Due to this, they found they had gotten a much clearer idea of which songs they would ultimately polish to possibly make the album. Simpson noted that the band had much more time to write and record this time, a luxury they had not enjoyed previously.

Inspiration for writing came from the band's record collections, musical tastes and influences. The band, fans of The Posies, met Ken Stringfellow at a couple of festivals they attended, and asked him if he wanted to get involved. He accepted, and visited the studio for a day, contributing piano.
The band had been listening to Martha Wainwright's Bloody Mother Fucking Asshole during the sessions and were fans of it. Towards the end of the recording sessions, Lightbody wrote a duet with her in mind, hoping to get her to sing it. She liked the song and agreed to record it. Eugene Kelly and a few members from The Reindeer Section also appear as choir in various songs throughout the album. Simpson credited Lee for being supportive of the band, and at the same time critical, when necessary. Each band member used to come to him for opinion on work they were doing. Morale during the sessions was high, with the band feeling a sense of togetherness seeing the hard work everyone was doing.

The album is the first without founding bassist Mark McClelland. Simpson feels that the album is more confident that its predecessor, as the band pushed themselves more than ever before during its sessions, and had a better understanding of music. According to him, the album title does not mean anything specific and that it can have its own meaning to different people.
Bassist Paul Wilson says that it came from the titles of songs they had written, citing "Open Your Eyes" as an example.

Appearances in other media
The album's third track, "Chasing Cars", was featured on the second-season finale of the ABC prime time hit drama Grey's Anatomy on 15 May 2006. A Grey's Anatomy-themed video of the song can be seen at the ABC website. The seventh track, "Make This Go on Forever", was later used in the third season of Grey's Anatomy, at the end of the episode entitled "Walk on Water" and later in 2018 it was featured in the fourteenth season of the show, during an episode with a story similar to Walk on Water.

The album's tenth track, entitled "Open Your Eyes," was used in the season 4 finale of CBS's Cold Case and in the season 12 finale of ER, the closing scenes of the pilot of The Black Donnellys and also in the second episode of the third season of Grey's Anatomy.

The sixth track, "You Could Be Happy", was used at the beginning the episode "Promise" of Smallville'''s sixth season, as well as in advertisements for Australian soap Neighbours. The single was also used in Doctor Who: Top 5 Christmas Moments and the penultimate episode of Season 2 of BBC sitcom Gavin & Stacey.

The first track, "You're All I Have", appears on the soundtrack of the teen film The Invisible.

In 2007, "Open Your Eyes" was used as the "Best Bits" song for Celebrity Big Brother 5 during the final watched by over 7 million viewers, the year of the race row.

In 2013, "Open Your Eyes" was heard in the penultimate episode of the hit NBC comedy The Office 9th season and the series. In it, Jim Halpert asks the documentary crew to make a video to prove his love for his wife, Pam Halpert, consisting of footage of their relationship throughout the entire series, during which the song plays,

ReleaseEyes Open was made available in four formats:
 Standard CD – with two UK bonus tracks
 Special edition – in a deluxe box, with the full album plus a DVD featuring footage shot over the past months, including the band's tour with U2, special gigs and the making of the new record. Additionally contained exclusive photos and other content.
Vinyl LP – a double LP gatefold vinyl
Cassette – only in Indonesia

The artwork for the album and the first single "You're All I Have" was designed by Mat Maitland of Big Active. It was revealed by Hot Press magazine on 16 March 2006, which called it "arty".

Critical receptionEyes Open received generally positive reviews from music critics. At Metacritic, which assigns a normalised rating to reviews from mainstream critics, the album received an average score of 67 out of 100 based 25 reviews, indicating "generally favorable reviews".

Commercial performance
The album hit number one in its 11th week on the New Zealand chart and reached 2× Platinum therefore shipping over 30,000 units. It also reached #1 in the ARIA Albums Chart, and was certified 3× Platinum on 8 January 2007 (for 210,000+ units shipped). It became the UK's best-selling album of 2006, selling over 1.5 million copies at the end of the year, with a cumulative total of 1.8 million. Furthermore, it peaked at #1 in the Irish Albums Chart, where it went 7× Platinum.

The album sold 36,191 units in its debut week throughout the U.S., substantially improving from their first week sales of Final Straw''. U.S. sales have totalled over 1,200,000 as of October 2008. In the UK, the album has sold over 2,333,000 copies, being certified 7× Platinum by the BPI.

Track listing

 The untitled twelfth track is a recording of background noise and one of Jacknife Lee's young children talking.
 "Perfect Little Secret" is a solo recording from Gary Lightbody.

Personnel

 Gary Lightbody – songwriter, lead vocals, guitar, backing vocals
 Nathan Connolly – guitar, backing vocals
 Paul Wilson – bass guitar, backing vocals
 Jonny Quinn – drums, percussion
 Tom Simpson – keyboards, samples
 Richard Andrews – art direction
 Iain Archer – background vocals, choir, chorus
 Paul Archer –	background vocals, choir, chorus
 James Banbury – arranger, cello
 Sam Bell – engineer
 Leon Bosch – double bass
 Adrian Bradbury – cello
 Charlie Clark – choir, chorus
 Caroline Dale – cello
 John Davies – mastering
 Caroline Dearney – cello
 Richard George – violin
 Ursula Gough – violin
 Janice Graham – violin, leader
 Timothy Grant – viola
 Ciaran Gribbin – choir, chorus
 Hrafnhildur Halldorsdottir – choir, chorus
 William Hawkes – viola
 Rebecca Hirsch – violin
 Peter Hoffman – engineer
 Eugene Kelly  – choir, chorus
 Alastair King – choir, arranger, background vocals
 Jacknife Lee – keyboards, programming, background vocals, producer, engineer, mixing, audio production
 Karin Leishman – violin
 Beatrix Lovejoy – violin
 Pauline Lowbury – violin
 Maya Magub – violin
 Mat Maitland – art Direction, images
 Zoe Martlew – cello
 Tom McFall – engineer
 David McGinty – choir, chorus
 Richard Milone –  violin
 Maxine Moore – viola
 Steve Morris – violin
 Everton Nelson – violin
 Fergus Peterkin – assistant engineer
 Steve Pryce – engineer
 Richael Reader – choir, chorus
 Jenny Reeve – choir, chorus
 Ben Russell – double bass
 Claire Scott – choir, chorus
 Stacey Seivewright – choir, chorus
 Charles Sewart – violin
 Hilary Skewes – string contractor
 Owen Skinner – mixing assistant
 Dan Tobin Smith – photography
 Stefano Soffia – assistant Engineer
 Matthew Souter – viola
 Cenzo Townshend – mixing
 Martha Wainwright – vocals
 Simon Wakeling – assistant engineer
 Nigel Walton – compilation
 Paul Willey – violin
 Lucy Williams – violin
 Sara Wilson – choir, chorus
 Warren Zielinski – violin

Charts

Weekly charts

Year-end charts

Decade-end charts

Certifications

References

2006 albums
Snow Patrol albums
Albums produced by Jacknife Lee
Fiction Records albums
A&M Records albums
Polydor Records albums